Chionodes adamas is a moth in the family Gelechiidae. It is found in North America, where it has been recorded from southern Quebec and Manitoba to Mississippi and Texas.

The larvae are leaf folders and tiers on Quercus alba, Quercus ilicifolia, Quercus laurifolia, Quercus prinus and Quercus rubra.

References

Chionodes
Moths described in 1999
Moths of North America